Lucas Saatkamp (born 6 March 1986) is a Brazilian volleyball player, a member of Brazil men's national volleyball team and Brazilian club SESI São Paulo, winning a gold medal with Brazil at the 2010 World Championships, a participant and silver medalist of the Olympic Games London 2012, World Champion 2014 and multi-medalist of the World League.

Personal life
Saatkamp was born in Colinas, Rio Grande do Sul, Brazil. On April 27, 2015 he married Beatriz. They have a son Theo.

Sporting achievements

Clubs

National championships
 2007/2008  Brazilian Championship, with Cimed Florianópolis
 2008/2009  Brazilian Championship, with Cimed Florianópolis
 2009/2010  Brazilian Championship, with Cimed Florianópolis
 2012/2013  Brazilian Championship, with RJX Rio de Janeiro
 2015/2016  Italian Championship, with DHL Modena
 2018/2019  Brazilian Superliga, with Funvic Taubaté

National trophies
 2015/2016  Italian SuperCup, with DHL Modena
 2015/2016  Italian Cup, with DHL Modena

FIVB Club World Championship
  2022 – with Sada Cruzeiro

International trophies
 2009  South American Club Championship, with Cimed Florianópolis

National team
 2005  FIVB U19 World Championship
 2007  Pan American Games
 2007  America's Cup
 2008  America's Cup
 2009  South American Championship
 2009  World Grand Champions Cup
 2009  FIVB World League
 2010  FIVB World League
 2010  FIVB World Championship
 2011  FIVB World League
 2011  South American Championship
 2011  FIVB World Cup
 2012  Olympic Games
 2013  FIVB World League
 2013  South American Championship
 2013  World Grand Champions Cup
 2014  FIVB World League
 2014  FIVB World Championship
 2015  South American Championship
 2016  FIVB World League
 2016  Olympic Games
 2017  FIVB World League
 2017  South American Championship
 2018  FIVB World Championship
 2019  FIVB World Cup
 2021  Nations League
 2021  South American Championship
 2022  FIVB World Championship

Individual
 2007 America's Cup – Best Server
 2008 Brazil Superliga – Best Middle Blocker
 2013 South American Championship – Best Spiker
 2014 FIVB World League – Best Middle Blocker
 2017 FIVB World Grand Champions Cup – Best Middle Blocker
 2018 FIVB World Championship – Best Middle Blocker
 2018–19 Brazilian Superliga – Best Middle Blocker
 2019 FIVB World Cup – Best Middle Blocker

References

External links

FIVB profile

1986 births
Living people
Sportspeople from Rio Grande do Sul
Brazilian men's volleyball players
Brazilian people of German descent
Olympic volleyball players of Brazil
Volleyball players at the 2012 Summer Olympics
Medalists at the 2012 Summer Olympics
Medalists at the 2016 Summer Olympics
Volleyball players at the 2016 Summer Olympics
Olympic silver medalists for Brazil
Olympic gold medalists for Brazil
Olympic medalists in volleyball
Brazilian expatriates in Italy
Expatriate volleyball players in Italy
Modena Volley players
Volleyball players at the 2020 Summer Olympics
Middle blockers